is a Japanese historical manga series written and illustrated by Yusei Matsui. It has been serialized in Shueisha's Weekly Shōnen Jump since January 2021, with its chapters collected in nine tankōbon volumes as of January 2023. An anime television series adaptation by CloverWorks has been announced.

Premise
Set between the Kamakura and Muromachi periods, during the Kenmu Restoration, the story follows the tale of Hojo Tokiyuki, a boy on the run after his family is overthrown by Ashikaga Takauji. With his only allies being a shady priest and his followers, the young lord must seek revenge and regain his glory, with his only weapon: a superhuman ability to flee and hide.

Media

Manga
Written and illustrated by Yusei Matsui, The Elusive Samurai started in Shueisha's shōnen manga magazine Weekly Shōnen Jump on January 25, 2021. Shueisha has collected its chapters into individual tankōbon volumes. The first volume was released on July 2, 2021. As of January 4, 2023, nine volumes have been released.

In North America, the manga is licensed for English release by Viz Media, who simultaneously publishes the chapters digitally as they are released in Japan on its Shonen Jump website. In October 2021, Viz Media announced that they would publish its volumes starting in Q2 of 2022. Shueisha also simulpublishes the series in English and Spanish for free on the Manga Plus app and website.

Volume list

Chapters not yet in tankōbon format
These chapters have yet to be published in a tankōbon volume.

Anime
An anime television series adaptation was announced on March 20, 2023. It is produced by CloverWorks and directed by Yuta Yamazaki, with scripts supervised by Yoriko Tomita, and character designs handled by Yasushi Nishiya.

Reception
In June 2021, The Elusive Samurai was nominated for the seventh Next Manga Award in the Best Printed Manga category and placed sixth out of 50 nominees. The series ranked eighth on the Nationwide Bookstore Employees' Recommended Comics of 2022.

Anthony Gramuglia of Comic Book Resources wrote that the series has become one of the "highlights of [Weekly] Shōnen Jumps newer titles", adding that "[it] is not only surprisingly emotional but also surprisingly intense, starting with all cylinders at full-throttle and never letting up".

References

External links
 

 

2021 manga
Anime series based on manga
CloverWorks
Historical anime and manga
Samurai in anime and manga
Shōnen manga
Shueisha manga
Upcoming anime television series
Viz Media manga